James Earickson (December 7, 1782 – June 11, 1844) was a U.S. politician from Missouri.

James Earickson was born in Isle of Kent, Maryland, and moved to Howard County, Missouri in 1818. He was elected to the Missouri State Senate as a Democrat in August, 1828. Less than five months later, in January, 1829, he was appointed as State Treasurer of Missouri. The city of Glasgow, Missouri was created in 1836 from land partially contributed by Earickson. On a personal note, he was married to the former Rebecca Malone and had three children. One of his granddaughters, Jane Perry Francis was married to David R. Francis who served as Governor of Missouri from 1889 to 1893.

References
 Missouri State Treasurer-Past Treasurers Biography

1782 births
1844 deaths
State treasurers of Missouri
Democratic Party Missouri state senators
People from Glasgow, Missouri
People from Queen Anne's County, Maryland
19th-century American politicians